This is a list of flag bearers who have represented North Macedonia at the Olympics.

Flag bearers carry the national flag of their country at the opening ceremony of the Olympic Games.

See also
North Macedonia at the Olympics
List of flag bearers for Yugoslavia at the Olympics

References

North Macedonia at the Olympics
Macedonia
Olympic flagbearers
Olympics